Theodore Hamm (born September 14, 1966, in Chicago) is an American author, writer and the
founding editor of the New York City-based literary and culture tabloid The Brooklyn Rail. Hamm currently serves as the director of the Journalism and New Media Studies program at St. Joseph's College, in Clinton Hill, Brooklyn.

Books 
Hamm is the author of Bernie's Brooklyn: How the New Deal City Shaped Bernie Sanders' Politics, published by OR Books in 2020.

Hamm is the editor of Frederick Douglass in Brooklyn, an annotated collection of speeches given by the abolitionist at leading Brooklyn institutions, which was published by Akashic Books in 2017.

He is the author of The New Blue Media: How Michael Moore, MoveOn.org, Jon Stewart and Company Are Transforming Progressive Politics, which was published in May 2008 by the New Press. His first book, Rebel and a Cause, about the 1960 execution of San Quentin death row author Caryl Chessman, was published by the University of California Press in 2001.

Hamm is co-editor (with Williams Cole) of Pieces of a Decade: Brooklyn Rail Nonfiction 2000-2010. His first novel, Hank Thompson's Blues, was published by Nobody Rocks Press in May 2009. From 2005-2015 he was a member of the Brooklyn Literary Council, which organizes the Brooklyn Book Festival.

Career 
Hamm holds a B.A. in American studies from Rutgers University (1988) and a Ph.D. in American history from the University of California-Davis (1996). His articles about New York City politics and culture have appeared recently in The Indypendent, Jacobin and City Limits. In 1997, he received the Outstanding Volunteer Service award from San Quentin State Prison for teaching in the prison's college program. He resides in Sunset Park, Brooklyn.

References

1966 births
Living people
American magazine editors
American essayists
American political writers
Writers from Chicago
American male essayists
University of California, Davis alumni
People from Sunset Park, Brooklyn